The National Hard Coal Company was set up as a commercial society by the Government of Romania in 1998. The main headquarters of the company is placed in Petroșani, the principal city in the coal mining region of Hunedoara County's Jiu Valley.
The company has its material base in Gorj, Hunedoara and Mehedinți counties with total reserves of 350 million tonnes of coal. 

The annual production is around 3 million tonnes of bituminous coal  and the total number of employees is around 12,000.

References

External links
 Official site
 History of coal mines and coal mining in Jiu Valley

Coal companies of Romania
Companies of Hunedoara County